Last Call at Maud's is a 1993 American documentary film directed by Paris Poirier.  The film explores the history of lesbian culture from the 1940s to the 1990s as it records the last evening of Maud's, a San Francisco lesbian bar that closed in 1989 after 23 years in operation.

The documentary combines vintage footage with interviews with Maud's owner, Rikki Streicher, its employees, and patrons, including Judy Grahn, Sally Gearhart, Del Martin and Phyllis Lyon.

Last Call at Maud's was shown as a work-in-progress at the San Francisco International Lesbian and Gay Film Festival on June 24, 1992. The film held its world premiere in San Francisco at the Castro Theatre on February 5, 1993; and screened at the 1993 Berlin International Film Festival in the Panorama section.

References

Further reading

External links
 
 
 
 
  Last Call at Maud's at Kanopy
  Last Call at Maud's collection at Online Archive of California
 

1993 films
1993 documentary films
1993 LGBT-related films
1993 in California
1993 in San Francisco
1990s American films
American documentary films
Documentary films about California
Documentary films about lesbians
Documentary films about San Francisco
Documentary films about United States history
History of women in California
Lesbian culture in California
Lesbian-related films
LGBT culture in San Francisco
LGBT history in San Francisco